Les Temps Modernes is a French journal, founded by Simone de Beauvoir, Jean-Paul Sartre, and Maurice Merleau-Ponty. Its first issue was published in October 1945.  It was named after the 1936 film by Charlie Chaplin.

Les Temps Modernes filled the void left by the disappearance of the most important pre-war literary magazine, La Nouvelle Revue Française (The New French Review), considered to be André Gide's magazine, which was shut down by the authorities after the liberation of France because of its collaboration with the occupation.

Les Temps Modernes was first published by Gallimard and was last published by Gallimard. In between, the magazine changed hands three times: Julliard (January 1949 to September 1965), Presses d'aujourd'hui (October 1964 to March 1985), Gallimard (from April 1985). Les Temps Modernes ceased publication in 2019, after 74 years.

Early history
The first editorial board consisted of Sartre (director), Raymond Aron, Simone de Beauvoir, Michel Leiris, Maurice Merleau-Ponty, Albert Ollivier, and Jean Paulhan. All published many articles for the magazine. Sartre's contributions included "La nationalisation de la littérature" ("The Nationalisation of Literature"), "Matérialisme et révolution" ("Materialism and Revolution"), and "Qu'est-ce-que la littérature?" ("What is Literature?"). Simone de Beauvoir first published Le Deuxième Sexe ("The Second Sex") in Les Temps Modernes.

In the preface to the first edition, Sartre stated the review's purpose: to publish littérature engagée. This philosophy of literature expresses a basic creed of existentialism—that an individual is responsible for making conscious decisions to commit socially useful acts. Thus, literature in the magazine would have a utilitarian component; it would not be just culturally valuable ("art for art's sake"). Other intellectuals, such as André Gide, André Breton, and Louis Aragon, disapproved of this orientation.  Sartre's response: "Le monde peut fort bien se passer de la littérature. Mais il peut se passer de l'homme encore mieux." ("The world can easily get along without literature. But it can get along even more easily without man.")

The works of many writers appeared in Les Temps Modernes. They include Richard Wright, Jean Genet, Nathalie Sarraute, Boris Vian, and Samuel Beckett.

Political divisions between board members soon surfaced. Raymond Aron quit in 1945 because of the magazine's Communist sympathies, becoming an editor at Le Figaro. At the time of the Korean War of 1950–1953, Merleau-Ponty resigned. Originally more supportive of Communism than Sartre, he moved progressively to the right as Sartre moved to the left. At the time, Sartre still endorsed Communism in his writings but in private expressed his reservations.

Sartre disapproved of Camus for seeing both sides in the Algerians' rebellion against their French colonial masters (The Algerian War—1954–62). In his bitterness against Camus, Sartre selected Francis Jeanson, who did not like the works of Camus, to review the Camus essay L'Homme Révolté (The Rebel). When Camus responded to the review with hurt feelings, Sartre put the final blow to a friendship that had lasted for years. He said, "Vous êtes devenu la proie d'une morne démesure qui masque vos difficultés intérieures. ... Tôt ou tard, quelqu'un vous l'eût dit, autant que ce soit moi." ("You have become the victim of an excessive sullenness that masks your internal problems. ... Sooner or later, someone would have told you, so it might as well be me.")

1960–2019
Les Temps Modernes enjoyed its greatest influence in the 1960s. At this time, it had more than 20,000 subscribers. During the Algerian War (1954–1962) it strongly supported the National Liberation Front, the primary group in the ultimately successful battle against the French. It fiercely denounced the extensive use of torture by French forces, opposed de Gaulle's government, and supported desertion and resistance to conscription. The journal printed testimonies by French soldiers denouncing the war and torture from 1958 to 1962. For this, it was censured and its premises seized.

From its inception the review has published many special issues. These include Sartre's 1946 description of the United States, an attempt to discredit the myths that many of the French held about this country. In 1955, Claude Lanzmann described Sartre's Marxist philosophy in an issue called  "La Gauche" ("The Left"). An issue on "La révolte hongroise" ("The Hungarian Rebellion") (1956–57) denounced Soviet repression. In 1967, at the time of the Six-Day War, an issue, "Le conflit israélo-arabe" ("The Israeli-Arab conflict"), contained articles by both Israelis and Arabs. In 1977, North African writers led by Abdelkebir Khatibi published the edition Du Maghreb. In 2001, a special edition was devoted to Serge Doubrovsky.

From 2016, the chief editor of Les Temps Modernes was Claude Lanzmann until his death on 5 July 2018, after a short illness. The editorial board consisted of Juliette Simont (Editorial Assistant to Lanzmann), Adrien Barrot, Jean Bourgault, Joseph Cohen, Michel Deguy, Liliane Kandel, Jean Khalfa, Patrice Maniglier, Robert Redeker, Marc Sagnol, Gérard Wormser, and Raphael Zagury-Orly. It was published bimonthly.

In 2019, following Lanzmann's death, Les Temps Modernes ceased publishing, after 74 years.

References

External links
 Revue Les Temps Modernes, Les éditions Gallimard

Existentialist movement in literature
1945 establishments in France
2019 disestablishments in France
Bi-monthly magazines published in France
Defunct literary magazines published in France
Defunct political magazines published in France
Existentialist works
French-language magazines
Magazines established in 1945
Magazines disestablished in 2019
Magazines published in Paris
Philosophy magazines